Kadir Mısıroğlu (1933–2019) was a Turkish writer, publisher and conspiracy theorist. He was known for his staunch opposition to the early Kemalist regime of Turkey and the advocating the restoration of the caliphate. Mısıroğlu's claims include that Joseph Stalin ordered his army to read the Quran on the sands against the Nazis, William Shakespeare being a secret Muslim, and that Karl Marx's Das Kapital was dictated by demons. He penned over 50 books, which include non-fiction, fiction, and poems. His works have been criticised for their approach, awareness and bias.

Biography 
Mısıroğlu was born in Akçaabat in the Trabzon Province. During his time at Istanbul University in the 1950s, He became the president of the Trabzon Highschool Graduates Association in his sophomore year, and opened seven student dormitories. He married Aynur Aydınaslan in 1961 and had three children: Abdullah Sünusi (1963), Fatıma Mehlika (1965), and Mehmed Selman (1973).

In 1964, he founded the publishing house Sebil and then the magazine named Sebil in 1976. He wrote over 50 books. Also in 1964, he reached fame through his book Lausanne, Victory or Defeat? (Lozan Zafer mi, Hezimet mi?).

In 1977, he was a losing candidate of the National Salvation Party for the Grand National Assembly of Turkey. Following the 1980 Turkish coup d'état, he fled and applied for asylum in Germany and settled in Frankfurt.

Following multiple stays for a year and a half at Acıbadem Altunizade Hospital for diabetes, he died on 5 May 2019 due to multiple-organ failure. His funeral was held at Çamlıca Mosque where a huge crowd of tens of thousands was in attendance. He was interred in the cemetery of the Nasuhi dergah and mosque at Üsküdar, Istanbul.

Beliefs 
Mısıroğlu has been described as a conspiracy theorist. He was known for his outspoken stance against Atatürk's reforms and Kemalism, and identified as an apologist of Islamism and Pan-Islamism. He was staunchly against Fethullah Gülen and his movement. He accused the movement of being business oriented rather than religiously oriented, and Gülen of making false claims, such as Muhammad regularly visiting his schools.

Mısıroğlu gained infamy with the quote "I wish the Greeks had won", for his resentment against the early years of the republic, and he continued, "neither the caliphate nor the sharia would be abolished!" He also had claimed that Joseph Stalin ordered his army to read the Quran on the sands against the Nazis, William Shakespeare was a secret Muslim whose name was Sheikh Pir, and Karl Marx's Das Kapital was dictated by demons. His works came under criticism by historian İlber Ortaylı for lacking scientific approach, knowledge and distorting the facts.

References

Citations

Bibliography 

1933 births
2019 deaths
People from Akçaabat
Turkish conspiracy theorists
Turkish Islamists
Turkish monarchists
Turkish writers